The lakes in Mongolia are distributed unevenly across the country. Many, including some of the largest, can be found in the Great Lakes Depression between the Altai, Khangai and Tannu-Ola mountain ranges in the west. A second group can be found in mountain valleys throughout the country. Lake Khövsgöl in a rift valley south of the Russian Sayan Mountains has the largest volume because of its great depth. The remaining lakes found in the steppe areas and in the Gobi desert are usually smaller and shallow.

The total area of the lakes is 16,003 km². The 83.7% of the total lakes number are the small lakes with surface area less than 0.1 km² (5.6% of the total area). There are 3,060 lakes with surface area 0.1 km² and more.

References 

 Ministry of Environment of Mongolia web site(in Mongolian)

Mongolia

Lakes